The 2019 Ethiopian Athletics Championships was the 48th edition of the national outdoor track and field championships for Ethiopia. It took place from 7–12 May 2019 in Addis Ababa at the Addis Ababa Stadium. A total of 40 events were contested by 1376 athletes (including 563 women).

Oromia Region won the men's team competition, while Mekelakeya won both the women's team and overall team titles.

Results

Men

Women

Mixed

References

Results
 Ethiopian championships, Addis-Ababa 7-12/05/2019. africathle.com. Retrieved 2021-04-03.
 Detailed Results. Athletics Ethiopia. Retrieved 2021-04-03.
Day 1, Day 2, Day 3, Day 4, Day 5, Day 6 (in Amharic). Ethiopian Athletics Federation. Retrieved 2021-04-03.

External links
 Ethiopian Athletics Federation website
 Video from Fana Television on YouTube

Ethiopian Athletics Championships
Ethiopian Athletics Championships
Ethiopian Athletics Championships
Ethiopian Athletics Championships
Sport in Addis Ababa